Statistics of National Association Foot Ball League in season 1913–14.

League standings
                          GP   W   L   T   Pts
 Brooklyn F.C.             14  12   0   2   26
 West Hudson A.A.          16  11   2   3   25
 New York Clan MacDonald    16   9   5   2   20
 Newark F.C.               15   5   5   5   15
 Paterson Rangers          14   5   5   4   14
 Jersey A.C.               10   3   2   5   11
 Kearny Scots              11   3   5   3    9
 Paterson True Blues        8   3   3   2    8
 Newark Caledonians        13   1   9   3    5
 Bronx United              12   2   9   1    5
 St.George F.C.            13   1   11  1    3
 Paterson Wilberforce      11   2   8   1    5

References
NATIONAL ASSOCIATION FOOT BALL LEAGUE (RSSSF)

1913-14
1913–14 domestic association football leagues
1913–14 in American soccer